The Bornean mountain ground squirrel (Sundasciurus everetti) is a species of rodent in the family Sciuridae.  The scientific name commemorates British colonial administrator and zoological collector Alfred Hart Everett.

Distribution and habitat
It is found in Indonesia and Malaysia.

References

 Hawkins, M.T.R., Helgen, K.M., Maldonado, J.E., Rockwood, L.L., Tsuchiya, M.T.N., Leonard, J.A. 2016. Phylogeny, biogeography and systematic revision of plain long-nosed squirrels (genus Dremomys, Nannosciurinae). Molecular Phylogenetics and Evolution 94: 752-764

Thorington, R. W. Jr. and R. S. Hoffman. 2005. Family Sciuridae. pp. 754–818 in Mammal Species of the World a Taxonomic and Geographic Reference. D. E. Wilson and D. M. Reeder eds. Johns Hopkins University Press, Baltimore.

Dremomys
Rodents of Malaysia
Rodents of Indonesia
Taxonomy articles created by Polbot
Mammals described in 1890
Taxa named by Oldfield Thomas
Taxobox binomials not recognized by IUCN